"Man of Mystery" is a song by the Shadows, released as a single in November 1960. It peaked at number 5 on the UK Singles Chart.

Background and release
"Man of Mystery" was written by Michael Carr for the theme tune for the film series Egdar Wallace Mysteries, based on the books by Edgar Wallace. For the first three series, "Man of Mystery" was a "slow and haunting arrangement featuring flute, accordion and string section". However, from the fourth series, an up-tempo beat version featuring an electric guitar and percussion was used.

The Shadows recorded their version of "Man of Mystery" in October 1960 and it was released as a double A-sided single with "The Stranger" in November. "Man of Mystery" was released in the US and Canada by Atlantic Records in February 1962, with the flip side "Kon Tiki", which had been released as a single in the UK in September 1961.

Reviewing for Disc, Don Nicholl wrote of "Man of Mystery" that the "melody is forceful without being complicated. The instrumentalists play it with inbuilt excitement that ought to have jukes rattling everywhere". He also described "The Stranger" as "another fairly solid instrumental with a theme that's rather reminiscent of some western tunes which have gone before".

Track listing
7": Columbia / DB 4530
 "Man of Mystery" – 1:58
 "The Stranger" – 2:37

7": Atlantic / 2135 (US and Canada, 1962)
 "Man of Mystery" – 2:00
 "Kon Tiki" – 1:55

Charts
"Man of Mystery"

"The Stranger"

Cover versions 
 In 1961, American musician Chet Atkins released a cover of the song as a single.
 In 1965, American guitarist Al Caiola covered the song on his album Sounds for Spies and Private Eyes.
 In 1976, English guitarist Bert Weedon covered the song on his compilation album 22 Golden Guitar Greats.
 In 1981, English producer Nigel Wright, as Mojo, sampled the song on his Shadows medley single "Dance On", which peaked at number 70 on the UK Singles Chart.
 In 1994, Danish singer Tommy Seebach, as Seebach Band, covered the song on his album Instrumental Megahits 1.
 In 2016, French guitarist Noël Akchoté covered the song on his album Shot Gun – Plays the Shadows.

References

1960 singles
1960 songs
1960s instrumentals
The Shadows songs
Columbia Graphophone Company singles
Song recordings produced by Norrie Paramor